Hassan Daaboul (died February 25, 2017) was a Syrian army general. He was the head of military intelligence for the city of Homs. He was one of the 42 people killed by Tahrir al-Sham in a series of suicide bombings in Syria on February 25, 2017.

References

2017 deaths
People from Homs
Syrian generals
Year of birth missing